Bless Their Little Hearts is a 1984 American drama film produced and directed by Billy Woodberry and starring Nate Hardman. It was shot and written by Charles Burnett. The film had a limited theatrical release: it played for a week at the Royal in West Los Angeles and also at the Film Forum in New York.

In 2013, the film was selected by the Library of Congress for preservation in the United States National Film Registry for being "culturally, historically, or aesthetically significant".

In 2019, it was released on Home Video in a 2K restoration by Milestone Films.

Plot summary

Cast
 Nate Hardman as Charlie Banks
 Kaycee Moore as Andais Banks
 Angela Burnett as Banks Child
 Ronald Burnett as Banks Child
 Kimberly Burnett as Banks Child
 Langston Woodberry as mistress' son

Critical response 
Review aggregator website Rotten Tomatoes gives the film an approval rating of 100% based on reviews from 18 critics. At the time of its release, Vincent Canby of The New York Times concluded his review with "[the film] is so understated that at times it seems diffident, as if it were too shy to display its fury in more robust terms. This, however, is the style of the film that Mr. Woodberry, Mr. Burnett and their splendid cast, headed by Mr. Hardman and Miss Moore, have chosen to make, and it works beautifully."

References

External links
 
 
 
 
 
 Bless Their Little Hearts at UCLA Film & Television Archive ("L.A. Rebellion")
 Interview: Billy Woodberry on Bless Their Little Hearts by Steve Macfarlane and Madeline Coleman in Filmmaker Magazine, May 25, 2017 

1984 films
1984 drama films
1980s English-language films
American black-and-white films
American drama films
United States National Film Registry films
1980s American films